John Comben (born 13 June 1944) is a former Australian rules footballer who played with Carlton and Melbourne in the Victorian Football League (VFL).

Notes

External links 

John Comben's profile at Blueseum

1944 births
Carlton Football Club players
Melbourne Football Club players
Living people
Australian rules footballers from Victoria (Australia)